Kongu Kalvi Nilayam is a higher secondary school in Erode, Tamil Nadu, India. The school was started with the aim of educating rural students.

Extra curricular activities

Boarding schools in Tamil Nadu
High schools and secondary schools in Tamil Nadu
Schools in Erode district
Education in Erode